Mitheshwarnath Shiva Temple (Hindi/Devanagari: मीठेश्वरनाथ शिव मंदिर) is a Hindu Temple, dedicated to Hinduism God "Shiva". This temple is located at Chunabhatti Near Mitthu Mistri Chowk, Darbhanga District, Bihar, India. This temple built in the 20th century, as compared to Cornerstone of the Temple, and established by "Mitthu Mistri Thakur" in March 1949. The name of the temple is originally denoted by "Mitthu Mistri Thakur". After the Death of Mitthu Mistri Thakur on 21 October 1982, this temple is Maintained by the Mitthu Mistri Thakur son's (Viz. Motilal Thakur, Misrilal Thakur, Sonelal Thakur, Shobhalal Thakur, and Bipinlal Thakur). Now, this temple is maintained and care by the "Mitthu Mistri Thakur" Dynasty. Temples have on average a small number of visitors, usually local people per day, But during festivals like Maha Shivaratri, Shraavana, Naga Panchami, Kartik Purnima the number of visitors to the workplace and those who come to worship and pray to God Shiva are more.

History & Legend
This temple is about 71 years old if it is done from the established date. According to the foundation stone of this temple, the temple is built and established by "Mitthu Mistri Thakur". A Legend story is hidden between this temple. According to legend story told by "Mitthu Mistri Thakur" Grandson "J. M. Thakur", One day a sage came to Mitthu Thakur's house. Mitthu Thakur asked the sage, "What do you want, Baba?". The Rishi said, "I am very hungry, give me something to eat". Mitthu Thakur said, "Okay, you sit here and I bring you something to eat". Mitthu Thakur came to the house to arrange food for that Rishi, then it was mango season at that time, so Mitthu Thakur brought "curd", "flattened rice" and "mango" for that Rishi in a plate.

When Mitthu Thakur came to get food, the Rishi said to Mitthu Thakur, "Look, you offer water to that "Black Stone" every day, you do one thing, build a Shiva temple at the corner there". Mitthu Thakur said, "Okay! Okay! You should have food first" and started coming to the courtyard. When Mitthu Thakur started coming to the courtyard, he looked back, and the Rishi was not after him. Mitthu Thakur felt, maybe the Rishi would be out. When he went to look outside, the Rishi was not even outside. Mitthu Thakur started thinking, what should be done with this food. Mitthu Thakur thought that he would be Lord Shiva and buried the food with a plate below the ground where the Rishi had said to build the temple. For this reason, Mitthu Mistri Thakur built this Shiva temple and named this temple as "Mitheshwarnath Shiv Temple".

Architecture
The Architecture style of this temple is Mandapa compared to the Hindu temple structure. The architecture of this temple was built by a British architect. The area Calculation of the temple is 0.03 Acres OR 7.17 Dhur as by "Google Earth". The height of this temple is about 25–30 feet. The temple has 12 pillars, and courtyard of the temple is renovated in 2016 by the Mitthu Thakur dynasty. Inside the temple are "Shivling", "Nandi Statue" and "Ganesha idols with his Mother Parvati". There is a "Tulsi Square" outside the temple.

There is also two Tomb opposite to the Mitheshwarnath Shiva Temple, one which is tall in height is "Mitthu Mistri Thakur Tomb" and the second which is small in height is "Gangeswari Devi Tomb" (wife of Mitthu Mistri Thakur). Gangeswari Devi Tomb built first and then on 21 October 1982 after the death of Mitthu Mistri Thakur "Mitthu Mistri Thakur Tomb" built and established by his son's. Now, the "Mitthu Mistri Thakur" dynasty coming here every day for prays and worships this tomb. The compound wall of this tomb is re-built in 2018 by the "Mitthu Mistri Thakur" dynasty.

Gallery

References

External links 

Hindu temples in Bihar
Shiva temples in Bihar
20th-century Hindu temples
Tourist attractions in Darbhanga district